Renée Rienne (real name Renée Goursaud, alias Le Corbeau, "The Raven") is a fictional character in the spy-fi television series Alias. Played by Élodie Bouchez, she was introduced as a new character for the fifth season. Bouchez appears in the opening credit sequence during the first half of the fifth season; beginning with "S.O.S." Bouchez and her character were removed from the opening and listed as a special guest star.

Character biography
Rienne is number eight on the CIA's most wanted list. She worked secretly with Michael Vaughn for seven years. When she first approached Vaughn, she told him that his father Bill worked with her father on a project: Prophet Five. Renee has been responsible for numerous crimes, including the assassination of a Turkish interior minister, the deaths of three CIA agents in Serbia, an attack on a CIA listening post in Turkey, the theft of a cryogenic container from the Department of Special Research, and the infiltration of a US Army facility in Frankfurt, Germany.

In "Out of the Box" some details of her past are revealed. She was frequently ill as a child. Her father, Luc Goursaud, was a test subject of Prophet Five until learning something which frightened him. He took Rienne and fled, but was later taken from Rienne as she watched from hiding. She swore to take revenge on Prophet Five.

Many years later, Rienne stole a cryogenic container believing it contained her father. When opened, it instead disgorged Prophet Five researcher Doctor Aldo Desantis, who had worked with Renée's father. Desantis has been transformed, possibly by Project Helix technology, into a duplicate of Luc Goursaud. Sydney exposed him as an impostor and Desantis was extracted by Gordon Dean.

Rienne continued to work unofficially with APO. In the episode "The Horizon", she assisted Jack Bristow (albeit unsuccessfully) in trying to rescue Sydney from her Prophet Five kidnappers. During this mission, she executed Desantis, who was involved in the kidnapping, on the orders of Jack. In the episode "Maternal Instinct", she worked with Marcus Dixon to obtain information regarding a classified SD-6 mission.

In the episode "30 Seconds", Sydney offered her a position at APO, but Renée refused because she preferred to work according to her own schedule and she trusted very few people. She is later killed by Anna Espinosa, who altered her appearance and was posing as Sydney Bristow.

A subsequent autopsy of Renée recovered an incomplete microchip, hidden in her body for at least thirty years. It was marked with the name "Andre Micheaux", Vaughn's real name. The other half, hidden inside Vaughn, was marked "Renée Goursaud", Renée Rienne's real name. The completed microchip revealed the location of a nuclear fallout shelter containing research on Prophet Five compiled by Bill Vaughn and Luc Goursaud.

Reception
According to Jennifer Young, Rienne adds to the "show's setting of global diversity."

References

Alias (TV series) characters
Television characters introduced in 2005
Female characters in television